School City of Whiting is a school district headquartered in Whiting, Indiana, United States. The district serves Whiting.

School uniforms
All Whiting schools require their students to wear school uniforms.

Schools
The district includes three schools: Nathan Hale Elementary School, Whiting Middle School, and Whiting High School.

References

External links
 School City of Whiting

Education in Lake County, Indiana
School districts in Indiana
Whiting, Indiana